Andrea Briotti (born 2 May 1986) is an Italian footballer.

Biography
A native of Rome, Briotti started his career at A.S. Roma and received Italian youth teams call-up there. He played his only match at Serie A in April 2005, substituted Giuseppe Scurto in the 88 minute. The match ended in 3–3 draw.

In August 2005, he was loaned to Napoli Soccer at Serie C1. He played for the Champion 9 times. In the next season he joined Sassuolo in a co-ownership deal. He failed to make any appearances and left for Scafatese and Carrarese of Serie C2 on loan.

On 2 July 2009, the club announced Briotti and team-mate Michael Brini Ferri left for Viareggio permanently.

In 2010, he left for Rodengo Saiano and in January 2011 signed by Savona.
He played from 2011 to 2021 in the ASD Astrea , in the fourth and fifth divisions.

Honours
Serie C1: 2006

References

External links
 Profile at FIGC 
 Profile at Football.it 

Italian footballers
A.S. Roma players
S.S.C. Napoli players
U.S. Sassuolo Calcio players
A.C. Rodengo Saiano players
Serie A players
Association football defenders
Footballers from Rome
1986 births
Living people